Rhopalotenes is a genus of moths belonging to the subfamily Tortricinae of the family Tortricidae.

Species
Rhopalotenes argyrolemma (Diakonoff, 1954)
Rhopalotenes halirrhothia (Meyrick, 1938)
Rhopalotenes irresoluta (Diakonoff, 1954)
Rhopalotenes platyptila (Diakonoff, 1954)

See also
List of Tortricidae genera

References

External links
Tortricid.net

Tortricidae genera